The canton of Muret is an administrative division of the Haute-Garonne department, southern France. Its borders were modified at the French canton reorganisation which came into effect in March 2015. Its seat is in Muret.

It consists of the following communes:
 
Le Fauga
Frouzins
Labastidette
Lamasquère
Lavernose-Lacasse
Muret
Saint-Clar-de-Rivière
Saint-Hilaire
Seysses

References

Cantons of Haute-Garonne